Electric Skychurch is an electronic or acid trance band based in Los Angeles, California. It was formed in 1991 by composer and producer James Lumb, who initially involved vocalist Roxanne Morganstern and percussionist Alex Spurkel in the project.  Over time, Electric Skychurch has also included such musicians as Leigh Gorman of Bow Wow Wow.  The band has worked with record labels such as Los Angeles-based electronic music label Moonshine Music.

The single "Together" from the EP of the same name was their best-charting hit, reaching #1 on the College Music Journal RPM dance chart. The band is one of the featured artists in the documentary film Better Living Through Circuitry.

Member David de Laski went on to form the music project Lord Runningclam.

Discography 
 Knowoneness (1995)
 Together (EP) (1996)
 Sonic Diary (2001)
 Sonic Diary Singles (2006)

References

External links 
 Official site
 Official MySpace page

Electronic music groups from California
Musical groups from Los Angeles
Musical groups established in 1991
1991 establishments in California